The 1834 Ohio gubernatorial election was held on October 14, 1834.

Incumbent Democratic Governor Robert Lucas was re-elected to a second term, defeating Whig nominee, former Mayor of Cincinnati and former U.S. Representative, James Findlay.

General election

Results

References

1834
Ohio
Gubernatorial